The FIFA Finance Committee is one of the nine standing committees of FIFA. It focuses on the budgets and finances within FIFA.

Membership

References

FIFA Committees